Tom Adams (born 1958) is an American bluegrass guitarist and banjo player.

Adams began his career in 1969, playing banjo in his family bluegrass band in Gettysburg, Pennsylvania. In 1983 he joined Jimmy Martin's Sunny Mountain Boys, and then became one of the Johnson Mountain Boys in 1986.
Adams played with Rhonda Vincent & The Rage in 2000, He recorded an album, Live - At the Ragged Edge, with Michael Cleveland in 2004, and the album was awarded "Bluegrass Instrumental Album of The Year 2004" by the International Bluegrass Music Association.

Adams has also played with Dale Ann Bradley, in the Lynn Morris band, and later with  Bill Emerson & Sweet Dixie.  In 2009 Adams joined Michael Cleaveland and Flamekeeper as a singer and guitar player.

References

External links

American bluegrass musicians
American banjoists
Living people
1958 births
Place of birth missing (living people)
Johnson Mountain Boys members